"The Spaceship Graveyard" is a BBC Books adventure book written by Colin Brake and based on the long-running British science fiction television series Doctor Who.
It features the Tenth Doctor and Martha.

This is part of the Decide Your Destiny series which makes you choose what happens in the books.

Reception
The book has received some mixed reviews, though was successful enough to allow the range to continue.

References

2007 British novels
2007 science fiction novels
Decide Your Destiny gamebooks
Tenth Doctor novels
Books by Colin Brake
BBC Books books